Mahiabad (also Romanized as Mahīābād and Mahyābād; also known as Mayābād) is a village in Alqurat Rural District, in the Central District of Birjand County, South Khorasan Province, Iran. At the 2006 census, its population was 54, in 19 families.

References 

Populated places in Birjand County